The Matanzas Pass Bridge (also locally known as the Sky Bridge, or the Fort Myers Beach Bridge) is a bridge located in Fort Myers Beach, Florida.  It carries State Road 865 (San Carlos Boulevard) between the Florida mainland (via San Carlos Island) and Estero Island, which is a major tourist destination.  The bridge is one of the island's two connections to the mainland.  The other is the Bonita Beach Causeway on the south end of the island.

The current bridge has two traffic lanes, one for northbound traffic and one for southbound traffic. There is also a pedestrian lane, which is separated from the rest of the bridge by a concrete barrier. Fishing piers also exist underneath the bridge on each side. The bridge's current blue color was added in 2011, making it resemble the Jewfish Creek Bridge in Key Largo. 

The bridge was damaged but not destroyed by Hurricane Ian in 2022.

History

The original Matanzas Pass Bridge was a small wooden drawbridge built in 1921.  The roadway connecting to the bridge originally ran from the bridge along the coast to present-day Bunche Beach where it connected to John Morris Road, which goes on to McGregor Boulevard.  The original wooden bridge had a 54-cent toll.

At this point, San Carlos Island was part of the mainland.  A major hurricane in 1926 destroyed the original bridge, only five years after it was built.  This same hurricane also separated what is now San Carlos Island from the mainland, making the road impassible.  The body of water created by the hurricane separating San Carlos Island from the mainland was appropriately named Hurricane Pass.

In 1927, a concrete swing bridge was installed to replace the original.  San Carlos Boulevard was also constructed at this time as a more direct route to replace the original road.  The swing bridge was a recycled bridge that formerly operated on the east coast of Florida.  An electric motor was installed on the bridge in 1950 due to the area's rapidly growing shrimping industry, which caused the span to be opened frequently.

Despite being motorized, the bridge was old and unreliable, and island residents feared that the bridge would fail and strand them in the event of an emergency, such as a hurricane evacuation.  This concern led to the construction of Bonita Beach Causeway at the southern end of the island in 1965.

The swing bridge's age and continued structural weakness led the state to ultimately replace the bridge in the late 1970s.  Construction began on the current bridge in 1977 and it opened to traffic on October 15, 1979.  The current bridge is a 65 foot tall fixed span to accommodate the area's large shrimping vessels without disrupting traffic.  The current bridge was built one block east of the swing bridge to accommodate its height, and the old bridge's approach is now known as Old San Carlos Boulevard on the island side.

Gallery

References

Bridges completed in 1921
Bridges completed in 1927
Bridges completed in 1979
Bridges in Lee County, Florida
Road bridges in Florida
1921 establishments in Florida
Concrete bridges in the United States
Girder bridges in the United States